Mussidia irisella is a species of snout moth in the genus Mussidia. It was described by Achille Guenée in 1862 and is known from Réunion and Mauritius.

References

Phycitinae
Moths of Mauritius
Moths of Réunion